The Canon EF 50-200mm 3.5-4.5 is an EF mount normal-to-telephoto zoom lens. It is one of the first lenses in the Canon EF series. 

In June 1988, Canon announced the EF 50-200mm 3.5-4.5L lens. This lens has very similar physical qualities compared to the EF50-200mm 3.5-4.5. The main difference is that this is a L lens, meaning that the lens contains special lens elements which better correct for various aberrations. In the case of the EF 50-200mm 3.5-4.5 L, both an ultra-low dispersion ("UD") and a synthetic crystal fluorite ("Fluorite") were used. Aside from the different optical construction and slight variation in weight and length, the L and non-L lens were basically identical. Note that at this time period Canon did not protect its L zooms against adverse elements such as weather. Both this lens and the similar duo EF 100-300mm 5.6 and its L variant lacked weather sealing construction, sharing the same housing as their non-L counterparts. Canon did, however, supply the L versions with lens hoods and cases at the time of purchase, which were available for the non-L lenses for separate purchase.

Specifications

References

Canon EF lenses
Camera lenses introduced in 1987
Camera lenses introduced in 1988